Chester Lamar Taylor (born September 22, 1979) also known by his nickname "Che Tay",  is a former American football running back in the National Football League (NFL). He was drafted by the Baltimore Ravens in the sixth round of the 2002 NFL Draft. In 2006, he signed with the Minnesota Vikings and played four seasons before signing with the Chicago Bears. He played college football at the University of Toledo.

Early years
Taylor was a four-time all-state running back and sprinter at River Rouge High School before attending the University of Toledo.  While at Toledo, Taylor set school records for rushing yards and touchdowns.  In 2001, he led the Rockets to an impressive victory over in-state rival Cincinnati Bearcats in the Motor City Bowl, giving Toledo their first bowl win since the 1995 Las Vegas Bowl. He was named the MVP of the game with 31 (Motor City Bowl Record) carries for 190 yards (then a Motor City Bowl Record) and a touchdown. In track, Taylor competed in the 100-meter dash and recorded a PR of 11.14 seconds.

Taylor ranked seventh in nation for the 2001 season with 1,492 rushing yards (268 attempts, 5.3 yards-per-carry) and 20 touchdowns.  He also hauled in 26 receptions for 242 yards and three touchdowns, with a longest reception of 43 yards.

Taylor was named North Team MVP in the 2002 Hula Bowl.

College statistics

Professional career

Baltimore Ravens
Taylor was taken with the 35th pick in the sixth round (207th overall) of the 2002 NFL Draft by the Baltimore Ravens. He spent four years backing up Jamal Lewis, seeing minimal yet increasing playing time throughout his tenure with the team. He also developed himself as a receiving threat, making him the Ravens third down back.

Minnesota Vikings
Taylor was signed by the Minnesota Vikings to a four-year, $14.1 million contract on March 12, 2006. On October 22, 2006, Taylor set a Vikings franchise record for longest run from scrimmage when he ran for a 95-yard touchdown in the third quarter, which is also an NFL record for the longest run in the 3rd quarter, against the Seattle Seahawks. He also broke 1000 rushing yards for the first time in his NFL career. Taylor and Adrian Peterson were considered one of the NFL's top running back tandems.

Chicago Bears
Taylor was signed by the Chicago Bears to a four-year, $12.5 million contract on March 5, 2010. In 2010, Taylor shared carries with running back Matt Forte. His stats fell compared to his times with the Ravens and Vikings and rushed for only 267 yards on 112 carries for a 2.4 yard average.

Taylor was released by Chicago during final cuts on September 3, 2011.

Arizona Cardinals
Taylor was claimed via waivers for a one-year contract by the Arizona Cardinals on September 4, 2011.

See also
 List of Division I FBS rushing touchdown leaders

References

1979 births
Living people
Players of American football from Michigan
African-American players of American football
American football running backs
Toledo Rockets football players
Minnesota Vikings players
Baltimore Ravens players
Chicago Bears players
Arizona Cardinals players
People from River Rouge, Michigan
21st-century African-American sportspeople
20th-century African-American sportspeople